Limbe Omnisport Stadium (French: Stade Omnisport de Limbé) is a multi-purpose stadium in Limbe, Cameroon. It is used mostly for football matches and it also has athletics facilities. The stadium has seats for 20,000 people. It was built in 2012 and inaugurated on January 26, 2016.

It is one of the few stadiums in the world that was built on a hill, and has views of the sea. In November 2016, the stadium hosted its first international tournament. The stadium was one of the venues for the 2021 Africa Cup of Nations.

References

External links
Photo at worldstadiums.com

Sports venues completed in 2016

Athletics (track and field) venues in Cameroon
Cameroon
Multi-purpose stadiums in Cameroon
Football venues in Cameroon